Minna Heponiemi  (born 10 August 1977) was a Swedish women's international footballer who played as a forward. She was a member of the Sweden women's national football team and took part in the 1999 FIFA Women's World Cup.

References

1977 births
Living people
Swedish women's footballers
Sweden women's international footballers
Place of birth missing (living people)
1999 FIFA Women's World Cup players
Women's association football forwards
Hammarby Fotboll (women) players